Solomatin is a Russian surname. Solomatina is the female version.

Notable people with the surname include:

Aleksey Solomatin (1921–1943), Russian flying ace
Andrei Solomatin (born 1975), Russian footballer and manager
Tatyana Solomatina (born 1956), Russian politician
Yegor Solomatin (born 1964), Russian politician

Russian-language surnames